Pygospio elegans is a species of marine polychaete worms in the family Spionidae. It is found in Western Europe (France, Belgium, and The Netherlands).

References 

 Radishevsky, V.I., Pankova, V.V., Neretina, T., Stupnikova, A. & Tzetlin, A.B. 2016. Molecular analysis of the Pygospio elegans group of species (Annelida: Spionidae). Zootaxa 4083(2), pages 239–250,

External links 

 Pygospio elegans at WoRMS

Canalipalpata
Animals described in 1863